Alvin Harold Kukuk was a Republican member of the Michigan House of Representatives from 1993 through 1998.

Kukuk was a member of the Army National Guard and a volunteer firefighter. He also served as Macomb Township supervisor for eight years and as a county commissioner for two terms.

In the House, Kukuk was a strong opponent of abortion, introducing a bill to revoke the medical license of a doctor who performed an abortion based on the gender of the fetus. He also opposed legislation to repeal the ban on hunting on Sunday in Macomb County.

Kukuk was succeeded in the House by his then-wife Janet. He was twice an unsuccessful candidate for the Michigan Senate, including in 2001 after the expulsion of David Jaye.

Kukuk died on April 22, 2017 in Baton Rouge, Louisiana, aged 79.

References

1937 births
2017 deaths
People from Macomb County, Michigan
Military personnel from Michigan
County commissioners in Michigan
Republican Party members of the Michigan House of Representatives